James Avon Clyde, Lord Clyde,  (14 November 1863 – 16 June 1944) was a Scottish politician and judge.

Early life 
Clyde was born on 14 November 1863, the son of Dr James Clyde LLD (1821-1912). His father was a teacher at Dollar Academy and then at Edinburgh Academy.

He was educated at the Edinburgh Academy and at the University of Edinburgh, where he graduated with an MA 1884 and an LLB in 1888.

Career 
Clyde was called to the Scots Bar in 1889, and by the times he was appointed a King's Counsel (KC) in August 1901,
he was the leading junior counsel in Scotland. As a KC, he was retained by several railway companies and frequently appeared before the Law Lords.

He was later Dean of the Faculty of Advocates from 1915 to 1918.

He held office briefly as Solicitor General for Scotland from October 1905 to December 1905.

He was the unsuccessful Tory candidate for Clackmannanshire and Kinross-shire in 1906.
He was elected at a by-election in May 1909 as the Liberal Unionist Member of Parliament (MP) for Edinburgh West, and held the seat until 1918.
He was Coalition Unionist member for Edinburgh North from 1918 to 1920.

He was appointed a Privy Counsellor in December 1916.
He was also appointed to the Dardanelles Commission. He served as Lord Advocate from December 1916 to 1920 in Lloyd George's coalition government. He was appointed to the bench and served as Lord Justice General and Lord President of the Court of Session from 1920
to 1935, with the judicial title Lord Clyde. During this time Lord Clyde gave this famous quote (in taxation circles) in the case of Ayrshire Pullman Motor Services v Inland Revenue [1929] 14 Tax Case 754, at 763,764:

"No man in the country is under the smallest obligation, moral or other, so to arrange his legal relations to his business or property as to enable the Inland Revenue to put the largest possible shovel in his stores. The Inland Revenue is not slow, and quite rightly, to take every advantage which is open to it under the Taxing Statutes for the purposes of depleting the taxpayer's pocket. And the taxpayer is in like manner entitled to be astute to prevent, so far as he honestly can, the depletion of his means by the Inland Revenue."

He was a Deputy Lieutenant of Kinross-shire, and later became Lord Lieutenant of Kinross-shire from 1937 until his death. He was Chairman of the Trustees of the National Library of Scotland from 1936 to 1944.

Personal life 
In 1895 Clyde married Anna Margaret MacDiarmid. They had two sons; the older, James Latham Clyde, later also became Lord Advocate and Lord Justice General.

Clyde died in Edinburgh on 16 June 1944.

References

External links 
 

1863 births
1944 deaths
Deputy Lieutenants of Kinross-shire
Lord-Lieutenants of Kinross-shire
Scottish King's Counsel
20th-century King's Counsel
Clyde
Lord Advocates
Solicitors General for Scotland
Members of the Privy Council of the United Kingdom
Liberal Unionist Party MPs for Scottish constituencies
Unionist Party (Scotland) MPs
UK MPs 1906–1910
UK MPs 1910
UK MPs 1910–1918
UK MPs 1918–1922
Lords President of the Court of Session
Lords Justice-General
Deans of the Faculty of Advocates
Members of the Parliament of the United Kingdom for Edinburgh constituencies
People educated at Edinburgh Academy
Alumni of the University of Edinburgh